The 2012 Men's World Open Squash Championship is the men's edition of the 2012 World Championship, which serves as the individual world championship for squash players. The event took place in Doha in Qatar from 7-14 December 2012. Ramy Ashour won his second World Championship title, defeating Mohamed El Shorbagy in the final.

Prize money and ranking points
For 2012, the prize purse was $ 325,000. The prize money and points breakdown is as follows:

Seeds

Draw and results

Finals

Top Half

Section 1

Section 2

Bottom Half

Section 1

Section 2

References

External links
World Squash Championship 2012 website
PSA World Championship 2012 website

World Squash Championships
M
Men's World Open Squash
21st century in Doha
Squash tournaments in Qatar
Sports competitions in Doha
International sports competitions hosted by Qatar